28 Cancri is a star system in the zodiac constellation of Cancer. It is a variable star with the designation CX Cancri, and is close to the lower limit of visibility with the naked eye, having a mean apparent visual magnitude of 6.05. It is moving away from the Sun with a radial velocity of around +9 km/s.

Based upon proper motion variation, this is an astrometric binary system with high likelihood (99.8%). The visible component has a stellar classification of F0 Vn, indicating it is a F-type main-sequence star with "nebulous" lines due to rapid rotation. It is a Delta Scuti variable star with a period of 0.0960 days and an amplitude of 0.020 in magnitude. With 2.4 times the mass of the Sun it is spinning with a high projected rotational velocity of 133 km/s. 28 Cancri is radiating roughly 44 times the Sun's luminosity from its photosphere at an effective temperature of around 7,516 K.

References

F-type main-sequence stars
Delta Scuti variables
Astrometric binaries
Cancer (constellation)
Cancri, 28
Cancri, CX
Durchmusterung objects
071496
041574
3329